The 1988 United States Senate election in Texas was held on November 8, 1988. Incumbent Democratic U.S. Senator Lloyd Bentsen won re-election to a fourth term, defeating Republican U.S. Representative Beau Boulter. Bentsen easily won the Democratic nomination for another term, while Boulter came through a run-off in the Republican primary defeating Wes Gilbreath. After winning renomination, Bentsen was chosen by Democratic presidential nominee Michael Dukakis as his vice-presidential running mate and therefore ran for both the Senate and the vice-presidency at the same time. Although the presidential ticket lost the general election and did not carry Texas, Bentsen was always the favorite for the Senate election and won with 59.2% of the vote, compared to 40% for Boulter.

, this was the last time the Democrats won a U.S. Senate election in Texas.

Primaries

Democratic primary 
In the Democratic primary Democratic senator Lloyd Bentsen defeated the same opponent he had beaten in 1982, Joe Sullivan, a psychology professor from San Antonio.

Bentsen had been Senator from Texas since first winning election in 1970 and had been re-elected in 1976 and 1982. He was also Chairman of the Senate Finance Committee and the clear favorite for re-election in 1988. Sullivan stood on a platform calling for reduced spending by the federal government, but had been easily defeated by Bentsen in the 1982 Democratic primary. This was repeated in 1988 with Bentsen winning the primary with over 80% of the vote.

Republican primary 
Four candidates competed for the Republican nomination; U.S. representative Beau Boulter, former state representative Milton Fox, millionaire Houston businessman Wes Gilbreath and businessman Ned Snead. Boulter was a two-term representative for the 13th district, while Gilbreath was competing in his first election, but spent $500,000 on the primary.

Wes Gilbreath led in the March primary with 36.7%, but as no candidate won a majority, went into a run-off election against Beau Boulter who came second with 30.5%.

There were few policy differences between Boulter and Gilbreath, with both candidates being conservatives who opposed abortion and called for reduced government spending. Gilbreath spent about one million dollars of his money in his contest for the primary, while Boulter spent about $250,000. However Boulter won endorsements from many Texas Republican leaders, including the candidates who had come third and fourth in the March primary, as well as from anti-abortion groups.

Boulter won the April run-off for the Republican nomination with just over 60% of the vote.

Vice-presidential candidate 
In July 1988 the Democratic presidential nominee Michael Dukakis chose Lloyd Bentsen to be the Democratic vice-presidential candidate. As the Texas Democrats had already had their primary for senate candidate, Bentsen could not be replaced on the ballot. Bentsen was however able to run both for the Senate and for vice-president as Lyndon Johnson had gotten Texas law changed in 1960 to allow Johnson to do the same at the 1960 election.

However Beau Boulter attacked Bentsen for running for both the senate and vice presidency, calling it arrogant, unethical and possibly illegal. Boulter and the National Republican Senatorial Committee filed a complaint with the Federal Election Commission (FEC) claiming that the dual candidacy violated federal campaign finance laws as any spending in one race would unfairly affect the other campaign, however the FEC rejected the complaint and this decision was confirmed by the United States courts of appeals. Boulter continued to attack Bentsen over the dual candidacy running a campaign advert in August 1988 mocking Bentsen for trying to ride two horses at the same time.

Campaign 
Lloyd Bentsen was always the favorite for the election, with a large cash advantage over Beau Boulter. Filings with the FEC at the beginning of August showed Bentsen had $3.9 million compared to only $14,000 for Boulter. The financial advantage for Bentsen continued through the campaign and by the beginning of November Bentsen had raised $7.5 million for the senate election, while Boulter had raised $2.7 million.

Boulter's campaign receive little or no official Republican support, with the Republican presidential campaign giving a not very subtle endorsement of a "Texas Ticket", which was George Bush for president and Bentsen for the senate. However Boulter hoped to benefit from Bush's coattails and ran campaign adverts pointing to his links with Bush and Ronald Reagan. Boulter also ran adverts attacking Bentsen for supporting giving benefit to illegal immigrants, but this was denied by the Bentsen campaign. Meanwhile, Bentsen ran adverts showing things they said he had done for Texas such as passing a trade bill, catastrophic coverage legislation, repealing the windfall profit tax and preserving local bus services.

At the beginning of October 1988 Democratic polls were reported to show Bentsen at least 20% ahead of Boulter, with Bentsen spending much of his time campaigning for the presidential election and very little time on the senate election.

Election results 
Lloyd Bentsen won the senate election by a clear margin over Beau Boulter, at the same time as he and Michael Dukakis lost the presidential race, with George Bush winning Texas with 56% of the vote compared to 43% for Dukakis. Bentsen's vote total in the senate election was reported to be at the time the highest vote total in any Texas statewide election. Boulter's showing was particularly embarrassing for the Texas GOP since Vice President Bush easily carried Texas by a margin almost identical to the one Bentsen garnered in the Senate race.

See also 
  1988 United States Senate elections

References 

United States Senate
Texas
1988